"The Blue Note Recordings" and variants thereof usually refer either to material recorded by Blue Note Records, or to material recorded at the Blue Note Jazz Club or other venues of similar name. Releases of these recordings include:

Blue Note Records
The Complete Blue Note Recordings of Thelonious Monk, release of the Thelonious Monk Blue Note Sessions, by pianist Thelonious Monk
The Classic Blue Note Recordings of Dexter Gordon; see Mosaic Records discography (MS-014)
The Complete Blue Note & Roost Recordings of Bud Powell; see Mosaic Records discography (#116), 1986
The Complete Blue Note and Capitol Recordings of Fats Navarro and Tadd Dameron, see Fats Navarro, 1948
The Complete Blue Note Recordings of Albert Ammons and Meade Lux Lewis; see Mosaic Records discography (#103), 1983
The Complete Blue Note and Pacific Jazz Recordings of Clifford Brown, see Clifford Brown, 1984
The Complete Blue Note Recordings of the Tina Brooks Quintet, see Back to the Tracks
The Complete Blue Note Forties Recordings of Ike Quebec and John Hardee; see Mosaic Records discography (#107), 1984
The Complete Blue Note Recordings of Sidney Bechet; see Mosaic Records discography (#110), 1985
The Complete Bud Powell Blue Note Recordings; see Mosaic Records discography (#116), 1986
The Complete Blue Note Recordings of Herbie Nichols, see Herbie Nichols Trio, 1997
The Complete Blue Note Recordings of Freddie Redd, see Freddie Redd, 1989
The Complete Blue Note Recordings of George Lewis; see Mosaic Records discography (#132), 1990
The Complete Blue Note Recordings of Grant Green with Sonny Clark, see The Complete Quartets with Sonny Clark, 1990
The Complete Blue Note Recordings of Larry Young; see Mosaic Records discography (#137), 1991
The Complete Blue Note Recordings of Art Blakey's 1960 Jazz Messengers, see Pisces (album), 1960
The Complete Blue Note Recordings of Don Cherry, see Symphony for Improvisers
The Complete Blue Note/UA/Roulette Recordings of Thad Jones; see Mosaic Records discography (#172), 1997

Blue Note venues
Live at the Blue Note (Duke Ellington album), recorded in Chicago
The Classic Blue Note Recordings by Wayne Shorter
Keith Jarrett at the Blue Note: The Complete Recordings
Live at the Blue Note (Michel Camilo album)
The Very Tall Band: Live at the Blue Note by Oscar Peterson

See also
Blue Note Sessions (disambiguation)
Blue note (disambiguation)